White Ladies is a 1935 novel by the British writer Francis Brett Young. The granddaughter of a wealthy tycoon and his well-bred wife becomes obsessed with recovering the family estate, the Elizabethan manor house named White Ladies. Like many of the author's Mercian novels, much of the novel is set in Worcestershire.

References

Bibliography
 Cannadine, David. In Churchill's Shadow: Confronting the Past in Modern Britain. Oxford University Press, 2004.

1935 British novels
Novels by Francis Brett Young
Novels set in Worcestershire
Heinemann (publisher) books
Harper & Brothers books